Richard Herbert may refer to:
Richard Herbert of Coldbrook (died 1469), Welsh knight and brother of William Herbert, Earl of Pembroke
Richard Herbert, Lord of Cherbury (died 1596), English Justice of the Peace and Parliamentarian, grandson of the above
Richard Herbert, 2nd Baron Herbert of Chirbury (c. 1604–1655), grandson of the above
Richard Herbert (died 1603/1605), MP for Montgomery Boroughs
Richard Herbert (darts player) (1972–2012), Welsh darts player
Richard Herbert (died 1510), illegitimate son of William Herbert, 1st Earl of Pembroke
Richard Herbert (Ludlow MP) (died 1754), British Member of Parliament for Ludlow and Warden of the Mint
Richard Townsend Herbert (1755–1832), Irish politician